Donnelly House may refer to:

 Donnelly House and Gardens (Birmingham, Alabama), on the National Register of Historic Places (NRHP)
 Donnelly House (Mount Dora, Florida), on the NRHP
Bartholomew J. Donnelly House, Daytona Beach, Florida, on the NRHP
Daniel Donnelly House, Williamsport, Maryland, on the NRHP
Donnelly House (New Lebanon, New York), on the NRHP